Kaurik and (Hindi: कौरिक) is village in the Lahul and Spiti district, in Himachal Pradesh, India.  It is in the valley of the Parang or Pare Chu river before its confluence with the Spiti River. Kaurik is close to the border with Tibet, the opposite village on the Tibetan side being Tsurup Sumgyi (or Tsosib Sumkyil). China claims the village as part of its Zanda County, Tibet.

In 1975, landslides during an earthquake completely destroyed the village situated in Kaurik, Largest number of survivors of Kaurik village now reside in Hoorling village in this area. The ruins of Kaurik are in a restricted area under Indo-Tibetan Border Police (ITBP) control.

Kaurik is connected to the rest of India through the Kaurik–Sumdo Road, and from Sumdo, through two national highways—the NH 5 Sumdo-Nako-Shimla Highway through Kinnaur district and the NH 505 Sumdo-Kaza-Gramphu-Manali highway through the Spiti River valley. The latter remains closed for 7 months due to winter snows on the Kunzum Pass (4,551 m or 14,931 ft). A dual-use airstrip, 100 km to the west, is under construction, scheduled to be completed in 2024.

Notes

References 

Villages in Lahaul and Spiti district